Pickenia is a monotypic genus of minute sea snails, a marine gastropod mollusk in the family Cingulopsidae. The only known species is Pickenia signyensis, found on Signy Island  in the South Orkney Islands.

Description

The maximum recorded shell length is 1.48 mm. The shell is a pale orange-brown colour, with a yellow-brown aperture. The protoconch is usually dark purple-brown.

The holotype is held by Amgueddfa Cymru – National Museum Wales.

Distribution

The species has only been found on Signy Island in the South Orkney Islands. The holotype was collected by G. Picken in 1977.

Habitat 

The species' holotypes and paratypes were collected from rocky bottom on algae off the coast of Signy Island. The minimum recorded depth is 4 m. Maximum recorded depth is 10 m.

References

Cingulopsidae
Gastropods described in 1983
Fauna of the Southern Ocean
Monotypic gastropod genera
Signy Island
Taxa named by Winston Ponder